Monocarboxylate transporter 2 (MCT2) also known as solute carrier family 16 member 7 (SLC16A7) is a protein that in humans is encoded by the SLC16A7 gene. MCT2 is a proton-coupled monocarboxylate transporter. It catalyzes the rapid transport across the plasma membrane of many monocarboxylates such as lactate, branched-chain oxo acids derived from leucine, valine and isoleucine, and the ketone bodies acetoacetate and beta-hydroxybutyrate. It also functions as high-affinity pyruvate transporter.

Both Northern blot analysis and inspection of the human expressed sequence tag (EST) database suggest relatively little expression of MCT2 in human tissues. As well, the sequence of MCT2 is far less conserved across species than that of MCT1 or MCT4 and there also appear to be considerable species differences in the tissue expression profile of this isoform.

Of the four known mammalian lactate transporters (MCTs 1-4), MCT2 harbors the highest affinity for lactate. In parallel, MCT2 gene transcription has been demonstrated to respond with high-sensitivity to hypoxia, intracellular pH, and, to lactate.

See also
Monocarboxylate transporter

References

Further reading

 
 
 
 
 

Solute carrier family